Stefan Tytus Zygmunt Dąbrowski (1877–1947) of Radwan coat of arms – Physician, physiologist, biochemist, and Polish politician. Rector: Adam Mickiewicz University - Poznań, Poland (1945–1946).

Biography
Stefan Tytus Zygmunt Dąbrowski of Radwan coat of arms was born on January 31, 1877, in Warsaw, Poland, into an intelligentsia family (Żądło-Dąbrowski z Dąbrówki h. Radwan). Dąbrowski's szlachta (noble) family was a fundamental influence on his life, which included growing up in an atmosphere of patriotism in the environs of Warsaw at the end of the nineteenth century.

In January 1919, Poland's Prime Minister and Minister of Foreign Affairs, Ignacy Jan Paderewski, made Dąbrowski Vice-Minister of Foreign Affairs.

On May 11, 1939, the Senate of Adam Mickiewicz University in Poznań chose Dąbrowski, a professor, for the position of rector; however, the explosion of war beginning with Nazi Germany's invasion of Poland on September 1, 1939, made the accession of Dąbrowski's rectorial duties impossible. Dąbrowski had foreknowledge of events in 1939, and spent the duration of the war in many localities hiding from the Gestapo, Nazi Germany's secret police. Under the Nazi's Generalplan Ost, more than 61,000 Polish activists, intelligentsia, nobles (szlachta), actors, former officers, etc. (all those deemed capable of rousing the Polish people to defense and patriotic action), were to be interned or shot. (See: Operation Tannenberg, Operation Sonderaktion Krakau, and Massacre of Lwów professors.) Nazi racist ideology dictated the Polish elite were largely Nordic, and thus capable of dynamic leadership, therefore their liquidation or internment would deprive the Slavonic masses of Poland of any effective resistance.

Publications 
  "Battle for Polish Recruits Under Occupation"
  "The Issue of National Defense in Modern War: Organization of Government and the Supreme Command"

Footnotes

External links
 Photo Gallery of Life of STEFAN TYTUS ZYGMUNT DĄBROWSKI h. Radwan (1877 - 1947)
 From Creators of Poznań Series, Inaugural Lecture Titled, "Professor Stefan Tytus Dąbrowski - Steadfast Rector of the University of Poznań (1945-1946)" - delivered by Dr. Danuta Sipawko, historian

1877 births
1947 deaths
Stefan
Polish chemists
Politicians from Warsaw
Physicians from Warsaw
Nobility from Warsaw